Kettle Creek State Park is a  Pennsylvania state park in Leidy Township, Clinton County, Pennsylvania in the United States. The park is in a valley and is surrounded by mountains and wilderness. It features the Alvin R. Bush Dam built in 1961 by the U.S. Army Corps of Engineers as a flood control measure in the West Branch Susquehanna River basin. Many of the recreational facilities at the park were built during the Great Depression by the young men of the Civilian Conservation Corps. Kettle Creek State Park is seven miles (10 km) north of Westport and Pennsylvania Route 120. It is largely surrounded by Sproul State Forest.

Kettle Creek Reservoir

Alvin R. Bush Dam on Kettle Creek is an earth and rockfill, flood control dam. The reservoir has a capacity of 75,000 acre feet (93,000,000 m3) at the spillway crest.

Kettle Creek Reservoir is open to some recreational boating, fishing and ice fishing. Gas powered motors are prohibited on the reservoir. Motorized boats must be powered by electric motors only. Sailboats, rowboats, canoes, kayaks, and paddleboats are permitted on the waters of the lake. All boats must be properly registered with any state. Swimming is prohibited.

Elk
Elk can be seen quite often in the Kettle Creek State Park area.

Fishing and hunting
Kettle Creek and it tributaries are excellent cold water fisheries. The fishing quality in the areas down stream of the dam has been damaged by pollution from acid mine drainage.

Most of Kettle Creek State Park is open to hunting. Hunters are expected to follow the rules and regulations of the Pennsylvania Game Commission. The common game species are American black bears, eastern gray squirrels, ruffed grouse, white-tailed deer, elk, and wild turkey. The hunting of groundhogs is prohibited.

Bald eagles

Several bald eagles nest in the park area. On most days in the summer, it is not uncommon to see these animals patrol the waters for fish. It is a normal occurrence to see them soar over the lake and dive down to make a catch.

Trails
The trails of Kettle Creek State Park are open to hiking, cross-country skiing, horseback riding, and mountain biking. There is a  trail for horseback riding which begins and ends in the park and loops through Sproul State Forest. The mountain trail also loops through Sproul State Forest. Kettle Creek State Park is a trail head for the  Donut Hole Trail. There are several other short trails within the boundaries of the park.

Camping and picnicking
There are two campgrounds at Kettle Creek State Park. One lacks water spigots and flush toilets. The Lower Campground has 44 sites all with electric hook-ups. The Upper Campground was 27 sites with 12 electric hook-ups.

The picnic area has 50 picnic tables with charcoal grills and water spigots. Some picnic tables are sunny and some are shaded. The picnic area includes a softball field and volleyball court. A playground is also located near the picnic area.

Nearby state parks
The following state parks are within  of Kettle Creek State Park:
Bald Eagle State Park (Centre County)
Bucktail State Park Natural Area (Cameron and Clinton Counties)
Denton Hill State Park (Potter County) 
Hyner Run State Park (Clinton County)
Hyner View State Park (Clinton County)
Little Pine State Park (Lycoming County)
Lyman Run State Park (Potter County)
Ole Bull State Park (Potter County)
Patterson State Park (Potter County)
Prouty Place State Park (Potter County)
Sinnemahoning State Park (Cameron and Potter Counties)
Sizerville State Park  (Cameron and Potter Counties)
Upper Pine Bottom State Park (Lycoming County)

References

External links

  

State parks of Pennsylvania
United States Army Corps of Engineers dams
Protected areas established in 1954
Civilian Conservation Corps in Pennsylvania
Parks in Clinton County, Pennsylvania
Campgrounds in Pennsylvania
1954 establishments in Pennsylvania
Protected areas of Clinton County, Pennsylvania